Francesco Cergoli (October 22, 1921  – 2000) was an Italian professional football player and coach.

External links
Francesco Cergoli

1921 births
2000 deaths
Italian footballers
Serie A players
U.S. Triestina Calcio 1918 players
Atalanta B.C. players
Juventus F.C. players
Calcio Lecco 1912 players
Italian football managers
U.S. Triestina Calcio 1918 managers

Association football midfielders